Hauffenia is a genus of minute freshwater snails with an operculum, aquatic gastropod molluscs or micromolluscs in the family Hydrobiidae.

Distribution
Hauffenia is widely distributed in Europe (Italy, France, Austria, Slovakia, Hungary, northern Balkans).

Species
Species within the genus Hauffenia include:
Hauffenia erythropomatia (Hauffen, 1856)
Hauffenia kerschneri (Zimmermann, 1930)
subspecies Hauffenia kerschneri kerschneri (Zimmermann, 1930)
subspecies Hauffenia kerschneri loichiana Haase, 1993
Hauffenia kissdalmae Erőss & Petró, 2008
Hauffenia lucidulus (Angelov, 1967) / Hauffenia lucidulus (Angelov, 1967) / Horatia lucidulus (Angelov, 1967)
Hauffenia minuta (Draparnaud, 1805) / Islamia minuta (Draparnaud, 1805)
Hauffenia nesemanni A. Reischütz & P. Reischütz, 2006
Hauffenia sp. nov. from Slovakia
Hauffenia tellinii (Pollonera, 1898) - type species of the genus Hauffenia
Hauffenia wienerwaldensis Haase, 1992

References

External links
 

 
Hydrobiidae
Taxonomy articles created by Polbot